't Kuipje is a multi-purpose stadium in Westerlo, Belgium. It is currently used mostly for football matches and is the home ground of Belgian First Division A football club Westerlo. The stadium capacity is 8,035 

Around the stadium there are 6 other pitches. They are used by youth teams and by the first team for training.

References

Football venues in Flanders
Sports venues in Antwerp Province
Westerlo